Vittorio Brambilla (11 November 1937 – 26 May 2001) was a Formula One driver from Italy who raced for the March, Surtees and Alfa Romeo teams. Particularly adept at driving in wet conditions, his nickname was "The Monza Gorilla", due to his often overly aggressive driving style and sense of machismo. He won one Formula One race during his career, the 1975 Austrian Grand Prix, held in the wet.

Career

Born in the town of Monza itself, Brambilla began racing motorcycles in 1957 and won the Italian national 175cc title in 1958. He continued to race motorcycles on a casual basis throughout his career, finishing 12th in a guest appearance at the 1969 Italian 500cc motorcycle Grand Prix riding a Paton. Before becoming a mechanic he also raced go-karts. His older brother, Ernesto ("Tino"), was also a racing driver.

Formula Three, Formula Two, Sports cars

He returned to racing in 1968, in Formula 3 and won the Italian championship in 1972, by which time he was already racing Formula 2. Brambilla was 2nd to Jacky Ickx in a 1970 2-heat Formula Two race at the Salzburg Ring in Salzburg, Austria. He drove a March BMW to 4th place in Hockenheim, in a 1973 Formula Two race. There were two 10-lap heats covering . Brambilla won the City of Enna Cup, the 5th 1973 event in the European automaker's championship for 2,000 cc cars. He drove an Abarth-Osella. Brambilla captured the pole for the Monza 4-hour auto race in a BMW 3.5 CSL.

Formula One

March 1974–1976

In his first year of Formula One, Brambilla was as quick as his teammate Stuck, although more accident-prone. In the Swedish GP he ran in fifth until an engine problem. Brambilla finished tied for 18th, last, in the  Formula One World Championship standings. In 1975 he amazed many at the Belgian GP, where he led until encountering brakes problems after 54 laps, and at the 1975 Swedish Grand Prix, where he secured pole position until a transmission failure forced him to retire after 36 laps. His great day came at the Österreichring in 1975, when he won a wet Austrian Grand Prix. He spun off and wrecked the nose of his car as he took the chequered flag, and completed his slowing down lap with the front of the car destroyed while waving to the crowd. As the race was shortened, with 60% of it completed, he only received 4.5 points instead of 9 for the win. A more serious accident occurred that season when Brambilla crashed his March through a new curve at Watkins Glen during qualifying for the 1975 United States Grand Prix. He backed into a guard rail afterwards but was unhurt. The session ended at that point with Niki Lauda leading. During 1976 he suffered several accidents and mechanical retirements, collecting only one point at the 1976 Dutch Grand Prix. He qualified his March in 8th position for the 1976 United States Grand Prix West. In the race Brambilla was tapped from behind by Carlos Reutemann before they reached the first turn. He lost the right rear wheel on his March on the 35th lap of the 1976 United States Grand Prix after holding fifth place for a time.

Surtees (1977–1978)

In 1977, Brambilla moved to the Surtees team, where he scored six points. At the same time he also drove for the Alfa Romeo sports car team, achieving the World Championship for the team. Brambilla finished 8th in the 1977 Monaco Grand Prix.

Brambilla continued with Surtees in 1978. At the 1978 United States Grand Prix West he placed 17th in qualifying, with a time of 1:23.212. His #19 Beta Surtees TS 19 finished 14th after experiencing engine failure on lap 50.

In a multiple pileup at Monza in the 1978 Italian Grand Prix, Brambilla suffered serious head injuries when he was hit by a flying wheel during a multiple car collision on the opening lap. In reaction to that race, in which Ronnie Peterson sustained fatal injuries, it was announced in October 1978 that the Italian Grand Prix would move to the Autodromo Dino Ferrari circuit in Imola for the next three years although this did not actually happen until 1980. The 1979 Italian Grand Prix was at Monza again, and Brambilla recovered and returned to participate in that race.

Alfa Romeo (1979–1980)
Brambilla drove briefly for the Alfa Romeo Formula One team in 1979 and 1980. Heavy rain caused a slick track and slower times. In December 1979 Alfa Romeo revealed its Formula One race car for the 1980 season. The company named Patrick Depailler, Brambilla, and Bruno Giacomelli as its drivers. The racer was nearly identical to one driven by Giacomelli in the 1979 Italian Grand Prix. Alfa Romeo announced that it was working on a 1,500 cubic centimeter turbocharged engine which was to begin track testing in a Formula One car in the summer of 1980.

Retirement and death
Brambilla retired at the end of the 1980 season. In the early 1990s he opened a Formula One memorabilia shop in Milan, occasionally driving the safety car during the Italian Grand Prix. He died at Lesmo, near Milan, of a heart attack at the age of 63 while gardening at his home. He reportedly collapsed while mowing the lawn.

Racing record

Complete European Formula Two Championship results
(key) (Races in bold indicate pole position; races in italics indicate fastest lap)

Complete Formula One results
(key) (Races in bold indicate pole position; races in italics indicate fastest lap)

 Half points awarded as less than 75% of race distance completed.

References

External links
" Brambilla's Lamborghini Miura

1937 births
2001 deaths
Sportspeople from Monza
Italian racing drivers
Italian Formula One drivers
Formula One race winners
March Formula One drivers
Surtees Formula One drivers
Alfa Romeo Formula One drivers
European Formula Two Championship drivers
Italian Formula Three Championship drivers
Italian motorcycle racers
World Sportscar Championship drivers